Rajasekaran Pichaya (born 3 January 1941) is an Indian sprinter. He competed in the men's 4 × 100 metres relay at the 1964 Summer Olympics.

References

External links
 

1941 births
Living people
Athletes (track and field) at the 1964 Summer Olympics
Indian male sprinters
Olympic athletes of India
Place of birth missing (living people)